Pachypodium rutenbergianum is a species of Pachypodium native to Madagascar. The plant can reach 3 to 8 m high, and its trunk up to 60 cm in diameter at base. The plant has short branches and 1-cm long spines. Leaves are green and 10 to 15 cm long, 4 cm wide. Its flowers are white.

Varieties
Pachypodium rutenbergianum var. meridionale
Pachypodium rutenbergianum var. rutenbergianum
Pachypodium rutenbergianum var. sofiense

Each of these are considered by many botanists as separate species.

References

External sources

rutenbergianum
Endemic flora of Madagascar